Ion Ciontoloi (born July 7, 1958 in Ermoclia) is a Moldovan politician.

Biography 

Ion Ciontoloi was born on July 7, 1958 in Ermoclia, Ştefan Vodă District. He is the son of Danil Ciontoloi (born May 27, 1921 în Volintiri, Ştefan Vodă District) and Ana Ciontoloi. Ion Ciontoloi served as member of the Parliament of Moldova (2005–2007) and has been the governor of Căuşeni District since 2007.

In July 2010, Ion Ciontoloi became a member of the Liberal Democratic Party of Moldova.

References

External links 
 Aparatul preşedintelui
 Parlamentul Republicii Moldova
  List of candidates to the position of deputy in the Parliament of the Republic of Moldova for parliamentary elections of 6 March, 2005 of the Electoral Bloc “Moldova Democrata”
 List of deputies elected in the March 6 parliamentary elections
 Lista deputaţilor aleşi la 6 martie 2005 în Parlamentul Republicii Moldova

1958 births
People from Ștefan Vodă District
Living people
Moldovan MPs 2005–2009
Electoral Bloc Democratic Moldova MPs
Our Moldova Alliance politicians
Liberal Democratic Party of Moldova politicians
Romanian people of Moldovan descent
Moldovan economists